Ranunculin is an unstable glucoside found in plants of the buttercup family (Ranunculaceae). On maceration, for example when the plant is wounded, it is enzymatically broken down into glucose and the toxin protoanemonin.

References

Glucosides
Furanones
Ranunculaceae